Pan Am Flight 830 was a flight from New Tokyo International Airport (now known as Narita International Airport) in Tokyo, Japan, to Honolulu International Airport in Hawaii. On August 11, 1982, the Boeing 747-121 serving the flight, nicknamed Clipper Ocean Rover, was en route to Hawaii when the airplane was damaged by a bomb that had been placed on board. Despite the damage to the aircraft, Captain James E. "Skipper" O'Halloran III, of Spokane, Washington, was able to land in Honolulu safely. One person was killed while 284 survived; 16 of them were wounded.

Flight
The bomb, which had been placed under a seat cushion, killed 16 year-old Toru Ozawa, a Japanese national. The blast also injured 16 other people (including Ozawa's parents) and caused damage to the floor and ceiling. The aircraft remained airborne and made an emergency landing in Honolulu with no further loss of life.

Aftermath
The bomb was placed by Mohammed Rashed, a Jordanian linked to the 15 May Organization. In 1988, he was arrested in Greece, tried, convicted of murder and sentenced to 15 years in prison. He was paroled in 1996 after serving eight years. He was later extradited to the US from Egypt in 1998 to stand trial. In 2006, as part of a plea bargain agreement he was sentenced to a further seven years in federal prison. As per his agreement with US prosecutors in providing information about other terrorist plots, he was released from prison in March 2013 but  still remained in a federal immigration detention facility in upstate New York awaiting deportation. Rashed was relocated to Mauritania in November 2016.

Husayn Muhammad al-Umari was also indicted in the bombing of Pan Am Flight 830 and in 2009 was placed on the FBI Most Wanted Terrorists list. On November 24, 2009, the Department of State announced that it was offering a reward of up to $5 million for Abu Ibrahim, then about 73 years old.  The previous reward of $200,000 had produced no results. , he is still at large. 

The aircraft was later put back in service by Pan American World Airways and remained in operation for various carriers until the early 1990s. It was scrapped in 2005.

See also

 Philippine Airlines Flight 434 - a similar incident perpetrated by Ramzi Yousef

References

External links
 
 U.S. Department of Justice Jordanian Man Sentenced in 1982 Bombing Of Pan Am Flight From Tokyo To Honolulu
 Airliners.Net 1981 picture of the "Clipper Ocean Rover"
AP Investigation: Terrorist eludes US in Iraq, by Adam Goldman and Randy Herschaft (Associated Press-Yahoo News; April 5, 2009) (Archive)

Aviation accidents and incidents in 1982
Accidents and incidents involving the Boeing 747
Airliner accidents and incidents in Hawaii
Failed airliner bombings
830
Terrorist incidents in Asia in 1982
Disasters in Hawaii
1982 in Hawaii
Airliner bombings in the United States
1982 murders in the United States
Crimes in Hawaii
August 1982 events in Oceania
Attacks on aircraft by Palestinian militant groups
1982 murders in Oceania
Terrorist incidents in the United States in 1982
Terrorist incidents in Japan in 1982
Terrorist incidents in Oceania in 1982